Below are the rosters of the teams that participated in the 1997 Copa América.

Group A

Argentina

Head coach: Daniel Passarella 

Argentina decided to alphabetically sort the numbers of their squad. This would be the last time they do so.

Chile

Head coach:  Nelson Acosta

Ecuador

Head cocah:  Francisco Maturana

Paraguay

Head coach:  Paulo César Carpegiani

Group B

Bolivia

Head coach:  Antonio López

Peru

Head coach: Freddy Ternero

Uruguay

Head coach:

Venezuela

Head coach:

Group C

Brazil

Head coach: Mário Zagallo

Colombia

Head coach: Hernán Darío Gómez

Costa Rica

Head coach:  Horacio Cordero

Mexico

Head coach:  Bora Milutinović

'''

References
RSSSF

Squads
Copa América squads